Chen Pei-hsuan (born 28 February 2000) is a Taiwanese professional tennis player.

She has a career-high WTA doubles ranking of 160, achieved on 25 February 2019. On 11 June 2018, she peaked at No. 919 of the WTA singles rankings. In her career, she won nine doubles titles on the ITF Women's Circuit, each time partnering Wu Fang-hsien.

Chen made her WTA Tour debut at the 2018 Washington Open, in the doubles draw, partnering with Wu Fang-hsien.

ITF Circuit finals

Doubles: 21 (9 titles, 12 runner–ups)

External links
 
 

2000 births
Living people
Taiwanese female tennis players
21st-century Taiwanese women